The Abdellah Ben Salem Mosque is a mosque in Oran, Algeria. Formerly the Great Synagogue of Oran, it was the largest synagogue in Africa. Also known as Temple Israélite, it was located on Boulevard Joffre, currently Boulevard Maata Mohamed El Habib.

History
Its construction began in 1879 at the initiative of Simon Kanoui, and took 38 years to complete.  Once Algeria gained its independence in 1962, almost all Algerian Jews, who were considered French citizens since the Crémieux Decree of 1870, relocated to France alongside the Pied-Noir community. In 1975, the synagogue was converted into a mosque and named after Abdullah ibn Salam, a seventh-century Jew from Medina and companion of Muhammad who converted to Islam.

Architecture
Its style shows Neo-Mudéjar and Moorish Revival influences.

See also
History of the Jews in Algeria
Djamaa Ben farès
Conversion of non-Islamic places of worship into mosques

References

External links
The Jewish Community of Oran | The Museum of the Jewish People at Beit Hatfutsot

Former synagogues in Algeria
Mosques converted from synagogues
Orthodox Judaism in North Africa
Orthodox synagogues
Mosques completed in 1880
Synagogues completed in 1880
Mosques in Oran
Sephardi Jewish culture in North Africa
Sephardi synagogues
20th-century mosques
1880 establishments in Africa
Moorish Revival synagogues
19th-century religious buildings and structures in Algeria
20th-century religious buildings and structures in Algeria